The 2013 NCAA Skiing Championships were held in Vermont and Vermont on March 6–9, 2013. Middlebury College hosted the event with alpine events at the Middlebury College Snow Bowl and Nordic events taking place at the Rikert Nordic Center.  The competition was won by the Colorado Buffaloes after compiling the largest final-day comeback in NCAA Skiing Championships history.  Twenty-one teams from three regions sent skiers to compete for the NCAA collegiate team championship and individual titles.

Regional Competitions
The NCAA skiing landscape is made up of three regions, each with one conference.  The Western Region comprises the Rocky Mountain Intercollegiate Ski Association (RMISA), the Central Region of the Central Collegiate Ski Association (CCSA) and the Eastern Region of the Eastern Intercollegiate Ski Association (EISA).  Qualification for the NCAA Championships is not only attained from competition in each regional.

Venues And Events
The NCAA Skiing Championships are coed championship made up of eight events, two events in both alpine and Nordic racing for both men and women.  Alpine events are giant slalom and slalom and Nordic events are classical and freestyle (skate).  In Nordic competition, there is typically one shorter interval start race and one longer mass start race, and every two years it flips.

In 2013, the events were: Women's Giant Slalom and Men's Giant Slalom on Wednesday, March 6; Women's 5K Classical and Men's 10K Classical interval start on Thursday, March 7; Women's and Men's Slalom on Friday, March 8; and Women's 15K Freestyle and Men's 20K Freestyle mass start on Saturday, March 9.

All alpine events took place at the Middlebury College Snow Bowl and Nordic events at the Rikert Nordic Center.

Team Results

Source:

Individual Champions
Individual champions are the winners of each of the eight races.  Denver, Colorado and Vermont both captured two individual NCAA Championships while New Mexico and Utah had one apiece.  Denver's Kristine Haugen became just the second alpine woman since 1990 and fifth overall to sweep the individual championships.
 
Women's Giant Slalom Kristine Haugen, Denver
Men's Giant Slalom Jonathon Norbotton, Vermont
Women's Slalom Kristine Haugen, Denver
Men's Slalom Joonas Rasanen, New Mexico
Men's 10K Classical Rune Oedegaard, Colorado
Women's 5K Classical Anja Gruber, Vermont
Women's 15K Freestyle Joanne Reid, Colorado
Men's 20K Freestyle Miles Havlick, Utah

Source:

All-American Honors
All-American honors for skiing are administered by the United States Collegiate Ski Coaches Association and are determined by race results from the NCAA Championships. The top five skiers in each race are awarded a first-team All-America honor while skiers 6-10 are awarded second-team honors.

Women's Giant Slalom
First Team: Kristine Haugen, Denver; Kristine Riis-Johannessen, Vermont; Kristiina Rove, Utah; Kate Ryley, Vermont; Brooke Wales, Colorado 
Second Team: Devin Delaney, Denver; Thea Grosvold, Colorado; Ana Kobal, Utah; Geordie Lonza, Williams; Mary Sackbauer, Middlebury

Men's Giant Slalom
First Team: Chris Acosta, New Mexico; Jeremy Elliot, Utah; Sean Higgins, Vermont; Jonathon Norbotten, Vermont; Coley Oliver, New Hampshire
Second Team: Andreas Adde, Alaska Anchorage; Espen Lysdahl, Denver; Max Marno, Denver; Trevor Philp, Denver; Taylor Vest-Burton, New Hampshire

Women's Slalom
First Team: Tianda Carroll, Denver; Kristine Haugen, Denver; Lizzie Kistler, Dartmouth; Ana Kobal, Utah; Kristine Riis-Johannessen, Vermont
Second Team: Sara Kikut, Dartmouth; Georgie Lonza, Williams; Mateja Robnik, New Mexico; Kate Ryley, Vermont; Randa Teschner, New Hampshire

Men's Slalom
First Team: Sam Coffey, New Hampshire; David Donaldson, Middlebury; Jonathon Norbotten, Vermont; Joonas Rasanen, New Mexico; Taylor Vest-Burton, New Hampshire
Second Team: Chris Acosta, New Mexico; Kasper Hietanen, Colorado; Max Marno, Denver; Hig Roberts, Middlebury; Andy Trow, Utah

Women's 5K Classical
First Team: Marine Dusser, Alaska Anchorage; Anja Gruber, Vermont; Mary O'Connell, Dartmouth; Joanne Reid, Colorado; Sloan Storey, Utah
Second Team: Silje Benum, Denver; Linda Davind-Malm, Vermont; Annie Hart, Dartmouth; Maria Nordstrom, Colorado; Anna Svendsen, Utah

Men's 10K Classical
First Team: Viktor Brannmark, Alaska Anchorage; Ben Lustgarten, Middlebury; Rune Oedegaard, Colorado; Mats Resaland, New Mexico; Silas Talbot, Dartmouth
Second Team: Lukas Ebner, Alaska Anchorage; Miles Havlick, Utah; Lasse Molgaard-Nielsen, Alaska Anchorage; Scott Patterson, Vermont; Erik Soderman, Northern Michigan

Women's 15K Freestyle
First Team: Silje Benum, Denver; Marine Dusser, Alaska Anchorage; Eliska Hajkova, Colorado; Mary O'Connell, Dartmouth; Joanne Reid, Colorado
Second Team: Anya Bean, New Hampshire; Makayla Cappel, Denver; Annie Hart, Dartmouth; Rose Kemp, Utah; Rosie Frankowski, Northern Michigan

Men's 20K Freestyle
First Team: Miles Havlick, Utah; Niklas Persson, Utah; Rune Oedegaard, Colorado; Erik Soderman, Northern Michigan; Einar Ulsund, Utah
Second Team: Kyle Bratrud, Northern Michigan; Ben Lustgarten, Middlebury; Mats Resaland, New Mexico; Silas Talbot, Dartmouth; Sam Tarling, Dartmouth

Overall All-American Honors By School
Utah 12, Denver 11, Vermont 10, Colorado 9, Dartmouth 8, New Mexico 7, Alaska Anchorage 6, New Hampshire 6, Middlebury 5, Northern Michigan 4, Williams 2

Overall First-Team All-American Honors
Utah 7, Vermont 7, Colorado 6, Dartmouth 4, Alaska Anchorage 3, Denver 3, New Mexico 3, Middlebury 2, Northern Michigan 1

Overall Alpine All-Americans
Denver 8, Vermont 7, New Hampshire 5, Utah 5, New Mexico 4, Colorado 3, Middlebury 3, Dartmouth 2, Williams 2, Alaska Anchorage 1

Overall Nordic All-Americans
Utah 7, Colorado 6, Dartmouth 6, Alaska Anchorage 5, Northern Michigan 4, Denver 3, New Mexico 3, Vermont 3, Middlebury 2, New Hampshire 1

References

External links
 NCAA.com Skiing
 RMISA Western Region
 EISA Eastern Region
 CCSA Central Region

NCAA Skiing Championships
Skiing in Vermont
2013 in sports in Vermont
2013 in American sports
College sports tournaments in Vermont